Phyllodiaptomus wellekensae is a species of calanoid copepod in the family Diaptomidae.

The IUCN conservation status of Phyllodiaptomus wellekensae is "VU", vulnerable. The species faces a high risk of endangerment in the medium term.

References

Diaptomidae
Articles created by Qbugbot
Crustaceans described in 1993